Dombarovsky (masculine), Dombarovskaya (feminine), or Dombarovskoye (neuter) may refer to:
Dombarovsky District, a district of Orenburg Oblast, Russia
Dombarovsky (air base), an interceptor aircraft base in Orenburg Oblast, Russia
Dombarovsky (rural locality), a rural locality (a settlement) in Dombarovsky District of Orenburg Oblast, Russia